Richard Irving may refer to:

Richard Irving (cricketer) (born 1969), New Zealand cricketer
Richard Irving (footballer) (born 1975), English football (soccer) player
Richard Irving (director), American director, producer and actor

See also
Richard Irving Dodge (1827–1895), U.S. army officer
Dick Irvin (1892–1957), Canadian ice hockey player
Dick Irvin Jr. (born 1932), Canadian sportscaster and author